The Ghost Camera is a 1933 British mystery film directed by Bernard Vorhaus, starring Henry Kendall, Ida Lupino and John Mills, and based on "A Mystery Narrative", a short story by Joseph Jefferson Farjeon.

Despite being made quickly on a low budget, the film has come to be considered one of the most successful Quota quickies made during the 1930s.

Plot summary 
While driving back from a seaside holiday, a young man discovers that a camera has dropped mysteriously into his car. When he develops the negatives, one of the pictures appears to show a murder taking place while the others offer clues to where the event has taken place.

After identifying one of the women in the pictures, she and he go on a search through the countryside to try to locate her missing brother whose camera they believe it to be. Unfortunately, the police also appear to be on his trail, believing that he has just committed a robbery at a jewellery shop.

Cast 
Henry Kendall as John Gray
Ida Lupino as Mary Elton
John Mills as Ernest Elton
Victor Stanley as Albert Sims
George Merritt as Police Detective
Felix Aylmer as Coroner
Davina Craig as Amelia Wilkinson, a maid
Fred Groves as Barnaby Rudd, landlord

Production
The film was made at Julius Hagen's Twickenham Studios as part of a long-term contract to provide films for the American major studio RKO enabling it to comply with the terms of the Cinematograph Films Act 1927. Most such films were cheaply made supporting features which became known as "quota quickies". Hagen's Twickenham company developed a reputation as a leading producer of popular quota quickies.

The film's director, Bernard Vorhaus, had arrived in Britain from America in 1930 and established himself as a director of quota films in Britain's rapidly growing film industry. His films became notable for featuring rapid editing (he often used the young David Lean as editor, who claimed that Vorhaus was a major early influence on him) and location shooting, both of which were relatively rare for supporting films.

Reception
The film premièred in September 1933 at MGM's flagship Empire Cinema in Leicester Square as the supporting feature on a double bill headed by Turn Back the Clock. It was met by a hostile reception by the audience. However, when the film went on general release it proved popular with audiences and in a number of cinemas it was given top-billing.

References

Bibliography
 Chibnall, Steve. Quota Quickies: The Birth of the British 'B' film. British Film Institute, 2007.
 Richards, Jeffrey (ed.). The Unknown 1930s: An Alternative History of the British Cinema, 1929- 1939. I.B. Tauris & Co, 1998

External links 

1933 films
British mystery films
1930s crime films
British black-and-white films
Films shot at Twickenham Film Studios
Films directed by Bernard Vorhaus
Films set in England
Films set in Surrey
Films set in London
1933 directorial debut films
1930s British films